Mikel Aranburu Urtasun (born 29 October 1955) is a Navarrese politician, Minister of Finance and Financial Policy of Navarre from July 2015 to August 2019.

References

1955 births
Government ministers of Navarre
Geroa Bai politicians
Living people
Politicians from Navarre